Atyphopsis modesta is a moth of the subfamily Arctiinae. It was described by Arthur Gardiner Butler in 1887. It is found in the Amazon region.

References

Arctiinae
Moths described in 1887
Moths of South America